Gulbarga Lok Sabha constituency is one of the 28 Lok Sabha constituencies in Karnataka state in India. This constituency was created before the first general elections in 1951.

Assembly segments
Presently, Gulbarga Lok Sabha constituency comprises the following eight Legislative Assembly segments:

Members of Parliament

^-bypoll

Election Results

2019

2014

2009

See also
 Yadgir Lok Sabha constituency
 Kalaburagi district
 List of Constituencies of the Lok Sabha

References
Election Commission of India -http://www.eci.gov.in/StatisticalReports/ElectionStatistics.asp

Lok Sabha constituencies in Karnataka
Kalaburagi district